Katarina Maloča, married Mrčela (born 28 October 1975 in Zagreb, SFR Yugoslavia) is a former Croatian female professional basketball player.

External links
Profile at eurobasket.com

1975 births
Living people
Basketball players from Zagreb
Croatian women's basketball players
Power forwards (basketball)
Centers (basketball)
Beşiktaş women's basketball players
ŽKK Gospić players
Mediterranean Games gold medalists for Croatia
Competitors at the 1997 Mediterranean Games
Competitors at the 2001 Mediterranean Games
Mediterranean Games silver medalists for Croatia
Competitors at the 2005 Mediterranean Games
Mediterranean Games medalists in basketball